Christian Huitema (born 1953 in Nantes, France) was the first non-American chair of the Internet Architecture Board (IAB), serving from April 1993 to July 1995. He currently is a consultant focused on privacy on the Internet.

Biography
After graduating from the École Polytechnique, Huitema served for five years as an engineer at Sema Group in Montrouge before returning to the Centre national d'études des télécommunications (CNET; now part of Orange S.A.) in Issy-les-Moulineaux. In 1986, he joined the French Institute for Research in Computer Science and Automation (INRIA). Huitema collaborated on several research projects including the NADIR Project (jointly with CNET) to study the use of computer satellites, the European Strategic Program on Research in Information Technology's THORN project (first implementation of the X.500 distributed directory, precursor of ESPRIT's Paradise subproject), and the RODEO project (which aimed to define and test communication protocols for high-speed networks). He worked as a chief scientist for Bell Communications Research in the mid-1990s. At Microsoft, Huitema was involved with the development of 6to4 and Teredo tunneling.

References

External links
official website
ScienceDirect: The X.500 directory services by Christian Huitema

1953 births
French computer scientists
Living people